The Yuan dynasty in Inner Asia was the domination of the Yuan dynasty in Inner Asia in the 13th and the 14th centuries. The Borjigin rulers of the Yuan came from the Mongolian steppe, and the Mongols under Kublai Khan established the Yuan dynasty (1271–1368) based in Khanbaliq (modern Beijing). The Yuan was a Chinese dynasty that incorporated many aspects of Mongol and Inner Asian political and military institutions.

The Yuan directly ruled over parts of modern China, Korea, Mongolia, and Siberia (Russia). Specifically, the Yuan extended to Manchuria (modern Northeast China and Outer Manchuria), Mongolia, Siberia, the Tibetan Plateau and parts of Xinjiang. People from these 'Inner Asian' regions either belonged to the 'Mongol' class, 'Northern Han' class, or 'Semu' class.

In addition, the Yuan emperors held nominal suzerainty over the three western Mongol khanates (the Golden Horde, the Chagatai Khanate and the Ilkhanate).

Manchuria

Manchuria was originally ruled by the Han, Tang, Liao, and Jin dynasties before the emergence of the Mongol Empire in the early 13th century. During the Mongol conquest of the Jin dynasty (1211–1234), North China became ruled by Mongols, and Manchuria became part of the Yuan dynasty.

In 1269, the Yuan founder Kublai Khan set up the Liaoyang province (遼陽行省) which extended to the Korean Peninsula. In 1286, it became a Xuanweisi (宣慰司). In 1287, the Liaoyang province was established again, and lasted until the end of the Yuan dynasty.

According to Yuanshi, the official history of the Yuan dynasty, the Mongols militarily invaded Sakhalin island and subdued the Guwei (骨嵬) there. By 1308, all inhabitants of Sakhalin had submitted to the Yuan dynasty. After the overthrow of the Yuan dynasty by the Ming dynasty in 1368, some Mongols under Naghachu (originally a Yuan official) fled to Northeast Asia, where he became a general of the Northern Yuan dynasty. The Ming then conquered and annexed Manchuria after the Ming military campaign against Naghachu in 1387.

Mongolia

The ethnic Mongol rulers of the Yuan dynasty came from the Mongolian steppe, and Karakorum was the capital of the Mongol Empire until 1260.

During the Toluid Civil War, Mongolia was controlled by Ariq Böke, a younger brother of Kublai Khan. After Kublai's victory over Ariq Böke, Mongolia was put within the Central Region (腹裏) directly governed by the Central Secretariat at the capital Khanbaliq (Dadu). However, it was shortly occupied by Kaidu, leader of the House of Ögedei and de facto khan of the Chagatai Khanate during his war with Kublai Khan, although it was later recovered by the Yuan commander Bayan of the Baarin.

Temur was later appointed a governor in Karakorum and Bayan became a minister.

During the rule of Külüg Khan, the third Yuan emperor, Mongolia was put under the Karakorum province (和林行省; Helin Province) in 1307, although parts of Inner Mongolia were still governed by the Central Secretariat.

The province was renamed to the Lingbei province (嶺北行省) by his successor Ayurbarwada Buyantu Khan in 1312. After the overthrow of the Yuan dynasty by the Ming dynasty in 1368, the Yuan court retreated north whilst maintaining the dynastic name of "Great Yuan" (thenceforth known as the Northern Yuan dynasty in historiography) and maintained control over northern China, the Mongolian Plateau and Siberia.

Tibet 

After the Mongol conquest of Tibet in the 1240s, Tibet was incorporated into the Mongol Empire. After the enthronement of Kublai Khan, founder of the Yuan dynasty, Tibet was put under the Bureau of Buddhist and Tibetan Affairs or Xuanzheng Yuan, a government agency and top-level administrative department set up in Khanbaliq that supervised Buddhist monks in addition to managing the territory of Tibet.

Besides modern-day Tibet Autonomous Region, the Yuan also governed parts of Sichuan, Qinghai and Kashmir. It was separate from the other provinces of the Yuan dynasty such as those of former Song dynasty, but still under the administrative rule of the Yuan.

One of the department's purposes was to select a dpon-chen ('great administrator'), usually appointed by the lama and confirmed by the Yuan emperor in Beijing.

During the Yuan rule of Tibet, Tibet retained nominal power over religious and regional affairs, while the Yun managed a structural and administrative rule over the region, reinforced by military intervention.

Tibetan Buddhism was one of the main state religions of the Yuan dynasty, and the Sakya leader Drogön Chögyal Phagpa became Imperial Preceptor of Kublai Khan.

Yuan control over the region ended with the Ming overthrow of the Yuan, Tai Situ Changchub Gyaltsen's revolt against the Mongols, and the Ming annexation of Tibet.

Xinjiang
The Mongol Empire began to rule modern-day Xinjiang during their conquest of the Qara Khitai (Western Liao). After the division of the Mongol Empire and the established of the Yuan dynasty by Kublai Khan, Xinjiang became a battle place between the Yuan dynasty and the Chagatai Khanate.

Kublai attempted to subject Kaidu to an economic siege by entrenching his forces in the Tarim basin and over the Uyghurs, cutting him off from these resources. In 1276 he stationed a garrison in Khotan and reinforced it several times between 1278 and 1283. In 1278 he stationed a garrison at Beshbalik, which from 1280 was under the Chinese general Qi Gongzhi. From 1281 to 1286 the garrison was reinforced, and the Chagatai prince Ajiqi was also sent to join the garrison. In 1281, 22 postal stations were set up between Beshbalik and Shanxi province, and more were set up to link Khotan and Cherchen in 1286. Military agricultural colonies (tuntian were set up in Beshbalik in 1283 and 1286, and more set up between Khotan and Cherchen in 1287 in response to a famine in the Tarim basin. In 1278 a Qara Qocho regional supervision bureau was established, which later become a Pacification bureau, and in 1281, a Beshbalik protectorate was established. Through these, Yuan law and currency was imposed on the region. However, these measures were unsuccessful as the entire region was repeatedly raided by Kaidu and his allies. From 1288 to 1289 the Yuan was forced to start withdrawing from Kashgar, Khotan and Beshbalik back to the interior of China.

The Yuan had shortly put most of present-day Xinjiang under its control under the Bechbaliq province (别失八里行省), but they were occupied by the Chagatai Khanate in 1286. After a long-time war between them, most of Xinjiang became under the control of the Chagatai Khanate, while the Yuan dynasty only retained control over the eastern part of Xinjiang. No province was set up again by the Yuan dynasty in Xinjiang, although the Yuan imperial court did set up an institution named Qara-hoja commandery "哈剌火州總管府" in eastern Xinjiang in 1330, which was directly governed by the Yuan dynasty. After the fall of the Yuan dynasty in 1368, the Kara Del khanate was founded in Hami by the Yuan prince Gunashiri, a descendant of Chagatai Khan.

Suzerainty over western khanates 

The Yuan retained political suzerainty over the whole Mongol empire, including the three western khanates: the Golden Horde, the Chagatai Khanate and the Ilkhanate.

Since the Toluid Civil War in the 1260s, the Mongol Empire over time politically fragmented into four khanates.

The Kaidu–Kublai war (1268–1301) lasted a few decades.

After the death of Kublai Khan in 1294, Ghazan Khan of the Ilkhanate converted to Islam after his enthronement in 1295. He actively supported the expansion of Islam in his empire. Three years later, he sent his envoys to greet Kublai Khan's successor and 2nd Yuan emperor Temür, who responded favorably. The Ilkhanid envoys presented tribute to Temür and inspected properties granted to Hulagu in North China. They stayed at the Yuan capital (Khanbaliq, modern Beijing) for four years.

Around 1300, Kaidu and Duwa of the Chagatai Khanate mobilized a large army to attack Karakorum (Yuan control) during the final stage of the Kaidu–Kublai war. The Yuan army suffered heavy losses while both sides could not make any decisive victory in September. Duwa was wounded in the battle and Kaidu died soon thereafter. After that, Duwa, Kaidu's son Chapar, Tokhta of the Golden Horde and Ilkhan Oljeitu (Ghazan's successor) negotiated peace with Temür Khan in 1304 and agreed him to be their nominal overlord. This established the Yuan suzerainty over the western khanates.

In 1306, more fighting between Duwa and Chapar soon broke out over the question of territory. Temür backed Duwa and sent a large army under Khayisan in the fall of 1306, and Chapar finally surrendered. The territory controlled by Chapar was divided up by the Chagataids and the Yuan. The nominal supremacy of the Yuan, based on the same foundations as that of the earlier Khagans (such as the continued border clashes among them), lasted around a century, until the Ming dynasty replaced the Yuan dynasty in 1368.

The four khanates continued to interact with one another in the first half of the 14th century. They formed alliances, fought one another, exchanged envoys, and traded commercial products. In the case of the Yuan dynasty based in China and the Ilkhanate based in Iran (and later the Ming dynasty in China and the Timurid Empire in Iran), there was an extensive program of cultural and scientific interaction, pooling their resources in a cooperative military endeavor.

See also
Administrative divisions of the Yuan dynasty
Bureau of Buddhist and Tibetan Affairs
Mongol invasions and conquests
Division of the Mongol Empire
Semu
Tang dynasty in Inner Asia
Qing dynasty in Inner Asia

References 

Yuan dynasty
History of Manchuria
History of Mongolia
History of Tibet
History of Xinjiang
Inner Asia